Henry Percy Adams, (October 26, 1865 – April 7, 1930) was an Ipswich-born English architect, and member of the FRIBA .

Early life
Adams's father, Webster Adams (1841–1900), was a surgeon in Ipswich,  his mother was Alice Heal (1840–1888).

He was educated at Epsom College together with his brother Webster Angell Adams (1864–1895).
Adamas left Epsom in 1879 and moved to Gould House, Dedham, Essex, later he articled under Brightwen Binyon (1846–1909) - a locally known architect in Ipswich.
Adams was also a painter and exhibiting member of the Ipswich Fine Art Club.  He exhibited in 1886 a watercolour painting called 'Old Windmill' and two monochrome sketches: 'St. Martin's church, Cologne' and 'Tomb of Sir Walter Scott'. Later he exhibited at the Royal Academy in 1888.

Also in 1888, Adams joined the architectural office of Stephen Salter (1825–1896) at 19 Hanover Square, London. In the same year he won a Drawing Prize of the RIBA in 1888.

In 1897 he won the Donaldson Medal (for Architecture) and Godwin Bursary (established by George Godwin).

1913 Adams took over Stephen Salter's architectural practice.

Charles Holden, (originally his assistant in 1899 and then later his Chief designer) and Lionel Pearson (1879–1953, who had attended Liverpool University School of Architecture), both joined the practice in 1904. The practice then changed its name to Adams, Holden, and Pearson.

Major works
 1897–98 South wing of Bedford General Hospital, with a separate ward designed specifically for children, known as the 'Victoria Ward'
 1898 – Staircase Hall, Madresfield Court Worcestershire
 1900–1905 Chapel at Royal Victoria Infirmary, Newcastle upon Tyne. Co-designed with W. L. Newcombe.
 1900 – Dorking New Infirmary in Surrey
 1901 – The Royal Victoria Infirmary, Newcastle upon Tyne
 1901 – Unsuccessful competition design entry for Royal Infirmary, Glasgow
 1903 – General Hospital, Tunbridge Wells, Kent
 1903 – King Edward VII Sanatorium, Midhurst, Surrey (Closed in 2006 and awaiting conversion into apartments)
 1903 – Bedford County Hospital, Bedfordshire
 1904 – Beyoğlu Seaman's Hospital, Istanbul. Founded during the Crimean War by the British Foreign Office. It has a tower that provides a clear sightline of any incoming ships
 1906 – Woman's Hospital in Soho, London
 1907/1908 Unsuccessfully bid for the County Hall, London design
 1909 – House Semon, (now known as 'Rignall's Wood'), Great Missenden, Buckinghamshire for Gertrude Jekyll
 1910 – Bristol Royal Infirmary New Ward & Pavilions, Gloucestershire (with Charles Holden)
 1910 – Savoy Place, before the (Institution of Electrical Engineers) (IEE) moved in, alterations to the building were carried out by H Percy Adams and Charles Holden. This included renovation of the entrance hall, the lecture theatre and the creation of a library from the long room on the first floor

Family life
On 22 May 1890, he married Cicillia Clara Staddon (1865–1891) in Ipswich, Suffolk. In 1891 their son was born, his wife died after giving birth.In 1896 Henry married Alice Mildred Mathieson (Aunt of Sir Frederick Ashton).  They had two sons and a daughter

Adams died on 7 April 1930 at Westminster Hospital in London, aged 64.

References

20th-century English architects
1865 births
1930 deaths
People of the Victorian era
Fellows of the Royal Institute of British Architects
People from Dedham, Essex
Architects from Ipswich
Architects from Essex